Uvularia puberula, the mountain bellwort, is a plant species native to the eastern United States. It is common across Virginia, North and South Carolina, West Virginia, and adjacent parts of northern Georgia, eastern Tennessee, eastern Kentucky and southern Pennsylvania. Isolated populations have been found in southern Georgia, northern Alabama, southern New Jersey, and Long Island in New York State.

Uvularia puberula is a perennial herb with 1-3 pale yellow flowers per stem.

References

puberula
Flora of the Northeastern United States
Flora of the Southeastern United States
Plants described in 1803
Taxa named by André Michaux
Flora without expected TNC conservation status